Enda McCormick (born 1997/8) is an Irish Gaelic footballer who has played for Termon and both the Donegal and London county teams. He plays as a forward.

McCormick represented Donegal at minor and under-20 level. He was part of the team that reached the 2016 All-Ireland Minor Football Championship semi-finals.

McCormick scored a goal against Galway at Croke Park in 2016.

First featuring for his county at senior level under the management of Rory Gallagher, McCormick was 19 years of age then. He was named on the bench for the 2017 Ulster Senior Football Championship game against Antrim. In 2019, he was tipped for a return to the county senior squad. Declan Bonner called him up again for the county ahead of the 2020 season.

Alongside Termon teammate Nathan McElwaine, he played for London in the 2022 National Football League. He scored 1–02 in London's opening game victory over Carlow. He made his championship debut for London against Leitrim later that year.

References

1990s births
Living people
Donegal inter-county Gaelic footballers
Gaelic football forwards
London inter-county Gaelic footballers
Termon Gaelic footballers